The Spy in the Green Hat is a 1967 feature-length film version of The Man from U.N.C.L.E.s third season two-part episode "The Concrete Overcoat Affair". The episodes were originally broadcast in the United States on November 25, 1966 and December 2, 1966 on NBC.  The film was directed by Joseph Sargent and written by Peter Allan Fields with the story by David Victor. Robert Vaughn and David McCallum star in the film as they do in the television series. It is the fifth such feature film that used as its basis a reedited version of one or more episodes from the series.

Production
Unlike the four earlier feature movies, The Spy in the Green Hat made only minimal changes to the episodes. The musical cues were essentially the same, and no major scenes were added or removed. What was changed was the addition of some short scenes that are more violent, sexy, and disturbing than generally shown on American network television at the time.  For example, the deaths of Luger and von Kronen are shown longer and in more detail than on television. Pia Monteri is briefly shown in the film nude from the back, but on television that portion was edited out.  And Miss Diketon has lines in the film that, as enthusiastically delivered by Janet Leigh, make clear the sensual pleasure she receives from both inflicting and receiving pain.  Those lines were removed for the television version. 

The series theme played under the main titles was a faster tempo reworking by Nelson Riddle of Gerald Fried's third season arrangement featuring trumpets, organ and saxophone solo.

The titular "Spy in the Green Hat" is Mr. Thaler of THRUSH, played by Will Kuluva. Kuluva had previously played the head of U.N.C.L.E. as Mr. Allison in the unaired pilot for the series.  His character was replaced by Leo G. Carroll as Alexander Waverly.

Plot

Solo and Kuryakin are assigned to infiltrate a THRUSH secret base located in a Sicillian winery. The base is run by Louis Strago, who in conjunction with former Nazi Dr. von Kronen is planning to detonate atomic bombs in the Atlantic Ocean.  The bombs will cause the Gulf Stream to divert, wreaking havoc in Europe and the United States and warming Greenland sufficiently for it to become a strategic new home for THRUSH ("THRUSHland").

The agents are split up after an encounter with THRUSH, with Solo having to hide overnight in the house of Pia Monteri. When Pia's grandmother learns of this, she considers it a disgrace to her family's reputation (despite Solo's insistence that nothing inappropriate happened) and insists at the end of a shotgun that Solo marry Pia.  Solo manages to escape, but Pia and her grandmother enlist the aid of Pia's uncles to find him and return him for marriage.  Her uncles are the Stilleto brothers, Prohibition era gangsters in the U.S. who miss the "good old days". Solo barely escapes the wedding.

In one scene, 'Fingers' Stiletto smashes what appears to be a grapefruit half into the face of his wife, played by Joan Blondell. Blondell then breaks the 'fourth wall' by turning and staring straight into the camera with a look of exasperation. This is likely an homage to a similar scene between James Cagney and Mae Clark from 1931's 'The Public Enemy', in which Blondell also starred. Later in the film, Miss Diketon (Janet Leigh) comes to the rescue of Ilya Kuryakin (David McCallum) by stabbing one of the THRUSH thugs in the back with a large dagger, perhaps a tongue-in-cheek nod to her notorious role as a stabbing victim in 'Psycho' just a few years earlier.

Kuryakin and, ultimately, Pia, are captured by Strago and taken to his island base from which the bombs will be launched. Tortured by Miss Diketon (who truly loves her work), Kuryakin is to be executed at a party held for Strago's immediate superior in THRUSH, Mr. Thaler.  U.N.C.L.E. learns of the plot thanks to Solo's efforts and sends an assault force to bomb the island, killing everyone on it.  With Mr. Waverly's reluctant approval, Solo attempts a rescue of Kuryakin and Pia before the bombers attack.  Strago's defenses prove too much, however, and Solo finds himself allied with the Stilleto brothers - who have come to the island as well in search of Pia.  Miss Diketon betrays Strago due to his dismissal of her over a minor error, and with her help U.N.C.L.E. and the Stilletos are able to stop the missile launch.  Strago, Thaler, and von Kronen are killed in the process.   Diketon also dies in the fight, enjoying both the physical pain she is feeling and the fact that she saw Strago's plan fail.  Pia's family finally stops trying to get Solo to marry her, and the film ends with everyone enjoying an Italian dinner.

Cast

Robert Vaughn as Napoleon Solo
David McCallum as Illya Kuryakin
Leo G. Carroll as Alexander Waverly
Letícia Román as Pia Monteri
Jack Palance as Louis Strago
Janet Leigh as Miss Diketon
Eduardo Ciannelli as Arturo "Fingers" Stilletto
Allen Jenkins as Enzo 'Pretty' Stilletto  
Jack La Rue as Federico 'Feet' Stilletto  
Joan Blondell as Mrs. 'Fingers' Stilletto  
Ludwig Donath as Dr. Heinrich von Kronen  
Will Kuluva as Mr. Thaler
Penny Santon as Grandma Monteri  
Frank Puglia as Padre  
Vincent Beck as Benjamin Luger

Release
The Spy in the Green Hat is the 1966 feature-length film version of The Man from U.N.C.L.E.s third season two-part episode "The Concrete Overcoat Affair". The episodes were originally broadcast in the United States on November 25, 1966 and December 2, 1966 on NBC. The film was released on DVD in a collection package by Warner Archive Collection on November 2, 2011.

See also
List of American films of 1967

References

External links

1967 films
1960s spy films
Films directed by Joseph Sargent
Metro-Goldwyn-Mayer films
Films edited from television programs
Films scored by Nelson Riddle
The Man from U.N.C.L.E.
1960s English-language films
American spy films
1960s American films